The year 1625 in science and technology involved some significant events.

Chemistry
 First description of hydrogen by Johann Baptista van Helmont. First to use the word "gas".
 Johann Rudolf Glauber discovers sodium sulfate (sal mirabilis or "Glauber's salt", used as a laxative) in Austrian spring water.

Births
 June 8 – Giovanni Cassini, Italian astronomer (died 1712)
 March 25 – John Collins, English mathematician (died 1683)
 August 13 – Rasmus Bartholin, Danish scientist (died 1698)
 December 16 – Erhard Weigel, German mathematician and scientific populariser (died 1699)
 December 20 – David Gregory, Scottish physician and inventor (died 1720)
 Samuel Morland, English inventor (died 1695)

Deaths
 March 7 – Johann Bayer, German uranographer (born 1572)
 April 7 – Adriaan van den Spiegel, Flemish-born anatomist and botanist (born 1578)
 May 6 – George Bruce of Carnock, Scottish coal mining engineer (born c.1550)
 Ferrante Imperato, Neapolitan natural historian (born 1550)
 Willem Schouten, Dutch navigator, died at sea (born c. 1567)

References

 
17th century in science
1620s in science